Chamber TV is a Luxembourgish television channel that broadcasts coverage of the activities of the national legislature, the Chamber of Deputies.  It is available by cable and by satellite.  It is owned and managed by the Chamber of Deputies, under the direction of the President of the Chamber (currently Fernand Etgen).

French-language mass media in Luxembourg
Legislature broadcasters
Luxembourgish-language mass media
Television networks in Luxembourg
Television channels and stations established in 2001